Two kids on a spree in Brussels is a French and Belgian short silent film shot in 1909, in Brussels, Belgium, showing two young children wandering past some of the main sightseeing places of the city.

Plot

A young boy and his sister see a motor-car ready to depart in front of their house. They hook their little cart to the back of it, step in and drive along until they reach the Place Royale, with the statue of Godfrey of Bouillon in its center and the Palais de Justice in the background. From there, they walk on to visit the Grand-Place and watch the Manneken Pis being dressed.

The children continue their expedition on a tram, which passes by the Brussels Stock Exchange, De Brouckère Square and the Gare du Nord.

A new tram ride take the children to the outskirts of Brussels where they see a milkmaid delivering milk with her dogcart. They wait until the dogcart is left unattended, remove the milk cans, climb aboard and happily set off for a ride.

Analysis

The surviving version of this film that is publicly available is in the English language, which seems to indicate that the film has been distributed outside of France and Belgium, maybe as an early precursor of touristic advertisement.

The film includes 28 shots, composing 10 scenes introduced by intertitles. Continuity editing links, the various shots and scenes albeit with some imperfections, both in the edition of the shots (characters or camera movements not consistent from one shot to the next), and of the scenes (order of the scenes not corresponding to geographic reality). This does not prevent the film from giving a convincing impression of an entertaining trip through the city enlivened by the antics of the children.

References

External links
  Toto et sa soeur en bombe à Bruxelles (1910) Two kids on a spree in Brussels at A Cinema History
 

1910s French-language films
1910 films
French black-and-white films
Belgian black-and-white films
1910 short films
French silent short films
French-language Belgian films